Larry Robinson (born 1951) is a former ice hockey player and coach in the National Hockey League.

Larry Robinson may also refer to:
 Larry Robinson (American football) (born 1951), American football running back
 Larry Robinson (Canadian football) (born 1942), player in the Canadian Football League
 Larry Robinson (basketball, born 1968) (born 1968), NBA player
 Larry Robinson (Texas basketball), American college basketball player (University of Texas)
 Larry Robinson (chemist), 12th President of Florida A&M University
 Larry Robinson (poet) (born 1947)
 Larry Robinson (politician) (born 1949), member of the North Dakota State Senate